Ida Georgina Moberg (13 February 1859 – 2 August 1947) was a Finnish composer and conductor. She was born in Helsinki, and took piano and singing lessons as a child.

She studied theory and composition from 1883 to 1884 at the St. Petersburg Conservatory. Later, she studied counterpoint under Richard Faltin and composition at the Helsinki Philharmonic Society's Orchestra School under Jean Sibelius. She studied composition from 1901 to 1905 under Felix Draeseke at Dresden Conservatory, and studied the Dalcroze method of improvisation in Berlin from 1911 to 1912.

After her education, Moberg worked as a composer, conductor, and teacher at the Helsinki Music Institute from 1914 to 1916.

Selected works

References

1859 births
1947 deaths
19th-century classical composers
20th-century classical composers
Finnish classical composers
Finnish music educators
Women classical composers
Women music educators
Finnish women classical composers
20th-century women composers
19th-century women composers
20th-century Finnish composers